

64001–64100 

|-id=070
| 64070 NEAT ||  || The Near Earth Asteroid Tracking (NEAT) programme, a joint-venture of the United States Air Force and the Jet Propulsion Laboratory, began operations in December 1995. The program currently utilizes 1.2-meter telescopes with NEAT CCD cameras at two observing locations, Palomar Mountain and the Maui Space Surveillance Site. || 
|}

64101–64200 

|-bgcolor=#f2f2f2
| colspan=4 align=center | 
|}

64201–64300 

|-id=288
| 64288 Lamchiuying ||  || Lam Chiu Ying (born 1949) is the department head of Hong Kong Observatory, China. He is also the former chairman of Hong Kong Bird Watch Society and spends a lot of effort in promoting public awareness of global warming. || 
|-id=289
| 64289 Shihwingching ||  || Shih Wing-ching (born 1949), a Chinese columnist who writes for a free daily newspaper in Hong Kong. He has been an active philanthropist. || 
|-id=290
| 64290 Yaushingtung ||  || Shing-Tung Yau (born 1949), a Chinese-American mathematician who specializes in differential geometry.. He received the Fields Medal in 1982 for his contribution to the Calabi conjecture in algebraic geometry. He also received a MacArthur Fellowship in 1984 and the Wolf prize in Mathematics in 2009. || 
|-id=291
| 64291 Anglee ||  || Ang Lee (born 1954), a Taiwanese-American film director, whose films include The Wedding Banquet (1993), Crouching Tiger, Hidden Dragon (2000) and Brokeback Mountain (2005). This last film won him the Academy Award for Best Director. || 
|-id=295
| 64295 Tangtisheng ||  || Tang Ti-sheng (1917–1959), a Cantonese opera playwright, scriptwriter and film director. During his 20-year career, Tang composed over 400 operas and achieved immense popularity within the Cantonese opera scene. His most famous works include Red Tears of an Aspen and The Reincarnation of Lady Plum Blossom. || 
|-id=296
| 64296 Hokoon ||  || Ho Koon Nature Education cum Astronomical Center, established in 1995, was the first special school in Hong Kong dedicated to science education. The words Ho Koon in Chinese mean "to observe" and comes from an ancient Chinese poem saying that one could be joyful through the observation of our physical Universe. || 
|}

64301–64400 

|-bgcolor=#f2f2f2
| colspan=4 align=center | 
|}

64401–64500 

|-bgcolor=#f2f2f2
| colspan=4 align=center | 
|}

64501–64600 

|-id=547
| 64547 Saku || 2001 WF || In Saku City, JAXA operates the Usuda Deep Space Center equipped with a 64-m-diameter parabolic antenna, which has been used to communicate with Japanese solar system probes, such as the Halley's comet probes "Sakigake" and "Suisei", the asteroid probe "Hayabusa" and the lunar orbiter "Kaguya" amongst others. || 
|-id=553
| 64553 Segorbe ||  || Segorbe, municipality of Castelló province, Spain, where the discovery occurred † || 
|}

64601–64700 

|-bgcolor=#f2f2f2
| colspan=4 align=center | 
|}

64701–64800 

|-bgcolor=#f2f2f2
| colspan=4 align=center | 
|}

64801–64900 

|-bgcolor=#f2f2f2
| colspan=4 align=center | 
|}

64901–65000 

|-id=974
| 64974 Savaria ||  || Savaria was the Roman name of the Hungarian town Szombathely, the administrative center of Vas county, located near the border with Austria. This naming also honors István Jankovics, director of the Gothard Astrophysical Observatory in Szombathely and discoverer of the supernovae 1968J, 1968S and 1969C. || 
|-id=975
| 64975 Gianrix ||  || Gianrico Filacchione (born 1972), an Italian astronomer who worked on the in-flight calibration of the imaging spectrometer VIMS-V on the Cassini mission. He currently studies Saturn's rings and hyperspectral data on icy satellites and is in charge of the calibration pipeline of Rosetta-VIRTIS, Dawn-VIR and Bepicolombo-VIHI experiments (IAU). || 
|}

References 

064001-065000